Kamil Shiafotdinov (born October 3, 1994) is a Russian professional ice hockey centre. He is currently playing with Neftyanik Almetievsk of the Supreme Hockey League (VHL).

Playing career
Despite being born in Russia, Shiafotdinov began his career in the Czech Republic with VHK Vsetín in 2011. Having returned to Russia in 2013, he made his Kontinental Hockey League debut playing with Atlant Moscow Oblast during the 2014–15 KHL season and went on to play five games for the team that season. He then played two games for Croatia-based team KHL Medveščak Zagreb the following season.

Shiafotdinov played the next three seasons in the VHL, with Tsen Tou Jilin City and Zauralie Kurgan before returning to the KHL by securing a try-out contract with Torpedo Nizhny Novgorod on 6 July 2020. He was later released and continued in the VHL with Neftyanik Almetievsk.

References

External links

1994 births
Living people
Atlant Moscow Oblast players
HC Khimik Voskresensk players
KHL Medveščak Zagreb players
Russian ice hockey centres
Ice hockey people from Moscow
Tsen Tou Jilin City players
VHK Vsetín players
Zauralie Kurgan players
HC Yugra players
Molot-Prikamye Perm players
Russian expatriate sportspeople in the Czech Republic
Russian expatriate sportspeople in China
Russian expatriate sportspeople in Croatia
Expatriate ice hockey players in Croatia
Expatriate ice hockey players in China
Expatriate ice hockey players in the Czech Republic
Russian expatriate ice hockey people